Luninsky District is an administrative and municipal district (raion), one of the twenty-seven in Penza Oblast, Russia. It is located in the north of the oblast. Its administrative center is the urban locality (a work settlement) of Lunino. Population: 19,944 (2010 Census);  The population of Lunino accounts for 39.6% of the district's total population.

Notable residents 

Vladimir Istomin (1810–1855), rear admiral, hero of the Siege of Sevastopol
Anton Legashov (1798–1865), painter, born in Lipovka

References

Notes

Sources

Districts of Penza Oblast